Doudleby nad Orlicí is a market town in Rychnov nad Kněžnou District in the Hradec Králové Region of the Czech Republic. It has about 1,700 inhabitants.

Administrative parts
The village of Vyhnánov is an administrative part of Doudleby nad Orlicí.

Notable people
Petra Bryant, British-American actress and writer, grew up here

References

Populated places in Rychnov nad Kněžnou District
Market towns in the Czech Republic